Erythrobacter cryptus  is an aerobic and slightly thermophilic bacteria from the genus Erythrobacter which has been isolated from a hot spring from the Alafache Spa in Portugal.

References

External links
Type strain of Porphyrobacter cryptus at BacDive -  the Bacterial Diversity Metadatabase	

Sphingomonadales
Bacteria described in 2003